Veslebotnskarvet  is a mountain of Buskerud, in southern Norway.

Mountains of Viken